Dilip Singh Judeo (8 March 1949 – 14 August 2013) was an Indian politician and former Minister of State for Environment and Forests in Prime Minister Atal Bihari Vajpayee's Bharatiya Janata Party-led National Democratic Alliance government. He hailed from the erstwhile royal family of Jashpur, and remains a popular political leader among the tribals of central India.

Career

Judeo started Ghar Wapsi campaign in Chhattisgarh. 

In November 2003 he was accused of accepting a bribe for mining rights in Chhattisgarh. The accusation was made by The Sunday Express newspaper, which had received a video of the bribe taking place. Judeo resigned from his ministerial position on 17 November 2003.

He was Member of Parliament from Bilaspur, Chhattisgarh.

Death

On 15 August 2013, he died because of kidney and lung infection.

References

External links
 The Indian Express full coverage of the story.
 Profile on Rajya Sabha website

1949 births
2013 deaths
Rajya Sabha members from Madhya Pradesh
Bharatiya Janata Party politicians from Chhattisgarh
India MPs 2009–2014
Chhattisgarh MLAs 2000–2003
Chhattisgarh MLAs 2003–2008
India MPs 1989–1991
Rajya Sabha members from Chhattisgarh
Lok Sabha members from Chhattisgarh
People from Jashpur district
Lok Sabha members from Madhya Pradesh
Bharatiya Janata Party politicians from Madhya Pradesh